The 2002 Cowansville municipal election was held on November 3, 2002, to elect a mayor and councillors in Cowansville, Quebec. Incumbent mayor Arthur Fauteux was re-elected without opposition.

Results

Source: "Election 2002 Eastern Townships," Sherbrooke Record, 4 Sherbrooke 2002, p. 4.

References

Cowansville
Cowansville municipal election